The Invention Secrecy Act of 1951 (codified at ) is a body of United States federal law designed to prevent disclosure of new inventions and technologies that, in the opinion of selected federal agencies, present a possible threat to the national security of the United States.

The U.S. government has long sought to control the release of new technologies that might threaten the national defense and economic stability of the country. During World War I, Congress authorized the United States Patent and Trademark Office (PTO) to classify certain defense-related patents. This initial effort lasted only for the duration of that war but was reimposed in October 1941 in anticipation of the U.S. entry into World War II. Patent secrecy orders were initially intended to remain effective for two years, beginning on July 1, 1940, but were later extended for the duration of the war.

The Invention Secrecy Act of 1951 made such patent secrecy permanent, though the order to suppress any invention must be renewed each year (except during periods of declared war or national emergency). Under this Act, defense agencies provide the PTO with a classified list of sensitive technologies in the form of the "Patent Security Category Review List" (PSCRL). The decision to classify new inventions under this act is made by "defense agencies" as defined by the President. Generally, these agencies include the Army, Navy, Air Force, National Security Agency (NSA), Department of Energy, and NASA, but even the Justice Department has played this role.

A secrecy order bars the award of a patent, orders that the invention be kept secret, restricts the filing of foreign patents, and specifies procedures to prevent disclosure of ideas contained in the application. The only way an inventor can avoid the risk of such imposed secrecy is to forgo patent protection.

By the end of fiscal year 1991, the number of patent secrecy orders stood at 6,193. Many such orders were imposed on individuals and organizations working without government support.  This number shrank for each fiscal year thereafter, until 2002.  Since 2002, the number of secrecy orders has grown, with 5,002 secrecy orders in effect at the end of fiscal year 2007.

Categories of inventions that are liable to classification
The subject matter of patents that are classified under this Act are secret, which makes it impossible to authoritatively say what types of technologies or inventions are being classified and hidden from public view.  However, a review of patents that were previously classified (but have since been declassified) would seem to indicate that the vast majority of them are those patents that deal in areas of high military significance, such as cryptography and weapons development.

A declassified document from January 1971, "PATENT SECURITY CATEGORY REVIEW LIST", lists the categories of inventions that the US Patent Office would refer to the Armed Services Patent Advisory Board for consideration.

See also
 Born secret
 Free energy suppression conspiracy theory
 Classified information in the United States
 Export of cryptography from the United States

References

External links
 Title 35, Chapter 17 of the US Code--full text of the Act from the Legal Information Institute
 Invention Secrecy, from the Federation of American Scientists
 Foerstel, Herbert N., Secret Science: Federal Control of American Science and Technology. Westport: Praeger, 1993, pp. 165–172.
 "Invention Secrecy Still Going Strong," Secrecy & Government Bulletin, May 1993, p. 2.
 https://fas.org/blogs/secrecy/2010/10/invention_secrecy_2010/
 http://www.freethetech.org

1951 in law
United States federal patent legislation
United States government secrecy
82nd United States Congress
Privacy of telecommunications